A fluorophosphate is one of several classes of ions or salts containing phosphorus in the +5 oxidation state and fluorine. Without the numerical prefix, monofluorophosphate is the most likely use.

Monofluorophosphate PO3F2−
Difluorophosphate PO2F
Hexafluorophosphate PF